Newby Bridge is a small hamlet in the Lake District, Cumbria, England. Historically in Lancashire, it is located several miles west of Grange-over-Sands and is on the River Leven, close to the southern end of Windermere.

The hamlet is the site of an intermediate halt on the Lakeside & Haverthwaite Railway. A terrace of houses adjoining the railway were built by the Furness Railway for its workers. The A590 road runs through Newby Bridge connecting Barrow-in-Furness to the M6 motorway close to Kendal.

History 
The name derives from the bridge over the River Leven.

See also

Listed buildings in Colton, Cumbria
Listed buildings in Staveley-in-Cartmel

References 

Hamlets in Cumbria
Furness
Staveley-in-Cartmel
Colton, Cumbria